Eriochilus dilatatus subsp. multiflorus, commonly known as the common bunny orchid, is a plant in the orchid family Orchidaceae and is endemic to Western Australia. It has a single short, smooth, flattened, egg-shaped leaf and up to twenty dull green, red and white flowers which are often closely packed. It grows in forest and woodland between Perth and Albany.

Description
When plants are not flowering, the leaf is much larger. The flowers are greenish with reddish markings, except for the lateral sepals which are white and are often crowded along the flowering stem. Flowering occurs from March to June and is enhanced by fire the previous summer.

Taxonomy and naming
The common bunny orchid was first formally described in 1840 by John Lindley who gave it the name Eriochilus multiflorus and published the description in A Sketch of the Vegetation of the Swan River Colony. In 2006, Stephen Hopper and Andrew Brown reduced it to subspecies status. The subspecies epithet (multiflorus) is a Latin word meaning "many-flowered".}

Distribution and habitat
The common bunny orchid is widespread and common in woodland and forest between Perth and Albany.

Conservation
Eriochilus dilatatus subsp. multiflorus is classified as "not threatened" by the Western Australian Government Department of Parks and Wildlife.

References 

dilatatus
Orchids of Western Australia
Endemic orchids of Australia
Plants described in 2006
Endemic flora of Western Australia